Doumit is a surname of Lebanese origin. Notable people with the surname include:

Mark Doumit (1961–2021), American politician
Sam Doumit (born 1975), American actress
Ryan Doumit (born 1981), American baseball player
Claudia Doumit (born 1992), Australian actress known for Timeless

Surnames of Arabic origin